Founded in 1913, the Erie Philharmonic is a professional orchestra located in Erie, Pennsylvania. The Philharmonic has held their performances at the 2,500 seat Warner Theatre on State Street in downtown Erie since 1974.

History
The musicians union attempted to form a symphonic orchestra in the late 1890s, but there was no popular support in Erie and the effort died. Another attempt to produce a symphony occurred in April 1913, when a group of 40 to 50 musicians rehearsed for months for a performance of Tchaikovsky's 1812 Overture and Edvard Grieg's Peer Gynt Suite. The concert never took place.

It was only months later, on 30 November 1913, that the Erie Symphony Orchestra, Erie Phil's earliest iteration, was born. It lasted just over two years, with its final concert held on 20 February 1916. On 30 January 1921, the orchestra was reorganized as the Second Symphony Orchestra. It lasted five years, with its final concert held on 2 May 1926.

The First Philharmonic held its first concert on 8 February 1921. The Second Philharmonic held its first concert on 7 February 1932. The Erie Phil disbanded for the duration of World War II, then incorporated on 23 September 1947. It has performed in Erie ever since.

The Erie Philharmonic Chorus was formed in 1953, and the Erie Junior Philharmonic was established in 1947.

The Erie Phil received a US$15,000 grant from the Erie Community Foundation to publicize its effort to find a new conductor for the orchestra.

Music directors

References

External links
 Erie Philharmonic official website

1916 disestablishments in Pennsylvania
1926 disestablishments in Pennsylvania
1941 disestablishments in Pennsylvania
Musical groups established in 1913
Musical groups established in 1921
Musical groups established in 1932
Musical groups established in 1947
Culture of Erie, Pennsylvania
1921 establishments in Pennsylvania
Orchestras based in Pennsylvania
1913 establishments in Pennsylvania